Colobopsis abdita (synonym Camponotus abditus) is a species of carpenter ant endemic to Guatemala. It was described by Forel in 1899.

Based on specimen collections, C. abditus ants are found in montane rainforest edge habitats, at elevations of 1,140 metres (3,740 ft). This species is rather small. Workers are normally 3.5 – 4 mm in length, soldiers at 5 – 6 mm, males at 4 - 4.5 mm, and the queens are 7.5 mm, making them the largest of the colony.

References

External links

Insects of Central America
Insects described in 1899
Colobopsis